The Galesville Rosenwald School was an elementary school for African-American children in Galesville, Maryland.

The school opened in 1929 with one room, and expanded to two rooms in 1931.  It was a Rosenwald school, whose design and construction was funded privately by the Rosenwald Fund.

It closed in 1956 as schools were racially integrated, and black students were then bussed to other schools.  A community group set the building up as a community center.

The building was restored with grant funding and is now the home of the Galesville Community Center, at 916 West Benning Road in Galesville.

References

Rosenwald schools in Maryland
School buildings completed in 1929
Buildings and structures in Anne Arundel County, Maryland
National Register of Historic Places in Anne Arundel County, Maryland
1929 establishments in Maryland